No. 1454 (Fighter) Flight was formed at RAF Colerne, Wiltshire on 27 June 1941, equipped with Turbinlite Douglas Boston and Douglas Havoc aircraft. By 26 January 1942 the flight moved to RAF Charmy Down, Somerset. On operations they co-operated with the Hawker Hurricanes of 87 Squadron, which also flew from Charmy Down. The flight was replaced with 533 Squadron on 8 September 1942 (not on 2 September due to administrative reasons) but officially disbanded as late as 31 January 1943.

533 Sqn, which had taken over men and machines, carried on flying the Turbinlite Bostons and Havocs till the system was abandoned on 25 January 1943, when Turbinlite squadrons were, due to lack of success on their part and the rapid development of AI radar, thought to be superfluous.

Aircraft operated

Flight bases

Commanding officers

References
Notes

Bibliography

 Delve, Ken. The Source Book of the RAF. Shrewsbury, Shropshire, UK: Airlife Publishing, 1994. .
 Halley, James J. The Squadrons of the Royal Air Force & Commonwealth 1918-1988. Tonbridge, Kent, UK: Air Britain (Historians) Ltd., 1988. .
 Jefford, C.G. RAF Squadrons, a Comprehensive record of the Movement and Equipment of all RAF Squadrons and their Antecedents since 1912. Shrewsbury, Shropshire, UK: Airlife Publishing, 1988 (second edition 2001). .
 Lake, Alan. Flying Units of the RAF. Shrewsbury, Shropshire, UK: Airlife Publishing, 1999. .
 Rawlings, John D.R. Fighter Squadrons of the RAF and their Aircraft. London: Macdonald & Jane's (Publishers) Ltd., 1969 (2nd edition 1976, reprinted 1978). .
 Sturtivant, Ray, ISO and John Hamlin. RAF Flying Training And Support Units since 1912. Tonbridge, Kent, UK: Air-Britain (Historians) Ltd., 2007. .

External links
 Aircraft and Markings of no. 511-598 sqn, amongst them 533 sqn, the successor of 1454 flt.

1454 Flight
Military units and formations established in 1941